Cole Gardner (born November 11, 1993) is an American football offensive tackle who is currently a free agent. He played college football at Eastern Michigan.

Professional career
Gardner signed with the Tampa Bay Buccaneers as an undrafted free agent on May 1, 2017. He was waived/injured on August 19, 2017 and was placed on injured reserve.

On September 1, 2018, Gardner was waived/injured by the Buccaneers and was placed on injured reserve. He was released on October 12, 2018.

References

External links
Tampa Bay Buccaneers bio

1993 births
Living people
American football offensive tackles
Eastern Michigan Eagles football players
Orlando Apollos players
Tampa Bay Buccaneers players